Jana Ruth Khayat (born August 1961) is a British heiress and businesswoman. She serves on the board of the department store Fortnum & Mason.

Early life and education
She was born Jana Ruth Weston in August 1961, the second child of Garry Weston, billionaire chairman of Associated British Foods, Jana graduated from Oxford University with a history degree.

Career
She started her career by joining the management team of Fortnum & Mason. Since the death of their father, Jana's brothers George and Guy have run Associated British Foods and Wittington Investments Ltd. (the parent company of Fortnums's and ABF) respectively while Khayat control of Fortnum's aided by her younger sister, Kate Hobhouse, as a non-executive director.

Khayat served as chairman until July 2008.

She is also on the Garfield Weston Foundation board of trustees.

Personal life
She and her husband, Antoine Khayat, have three children: George, Hamish and Helena. She is a keen equestrian and horse breeder.

References

1961 births
Living people
Weston family
Alumni of the University of Oxford
Fortnum & Mason